Capellinia is a genus of sea slugs, specifically of aeolid nudibranchs.

Species
Species in this genus include:
 Capellinia doriae Trinchese, 1874
 Capellinia fustifera (Lovén, 1846)
Taxon inquirendum
 Capellinia fuscannulata K. P. Rao, 1968
Species brought into synonymy
 Capellinia capellinii (Trinchese, 1879): synonym of Eubranchus capellinii (Trinchese, 1879) (synonym)
 Capellinia conicla Er. Marcus, 1958: synonym of Eubranchus conicla (Er. Marcus, 1958) (original combination)
 Capellinia rustya Marcus, 1961: synonym of Eubranchus rustyus (Er. Marcus, 1961)

References

 Martynov A.V. (1998). Opisthobranch mollusks (Gastropoda: Opisthobranchia) of the family Eubranchidae: Taxonomy and two new species from the Sea of Japan [in Russian]. Zoologicheskii Zhurnal. 77(7): 763-777

External links
 Trinchese S. (1874). Descrizioni di alcuni nuovi Eolididae del porto di Genova. Memorie della Reale Accademia delle Scienze dell' Istituto di Bologna. series 3 (4): 197-203

Eubranchidae
Gastropod genera